North Main is a prestigious and walkable community next to Downtown. This calm, well-established neighborhood enjoys all the perks of being close to the bustle and excitement, while still keeping its privacy and serenity. It also has its own set of sought-after restaurants and shops just steps from the historic homes that grace the residential parts of the neighborhood.
 
The area was originally founded in 1813 to be the business sector of Greenville. Residential growth sprang up in the area until the Great Depression, and it was several decades before it began to grow again. With the rejuvenation of Downtown, North Main benefited and became a thriving hub.
 
As one of the oldest neighborhoods in Greenville, North Main is full of historic homes. However, it underwent serious rejuvenation over the last several decades. Many of the historic homes have been carefully renovated to keep their charm while giving them modern amenities. There are also incredible new constructions, single-family homes, making North Main a treasure chest of beautiful real estate.

The area is surrounded north of Stone Avenue, west of Mohawk Drive and Chick Springs Road; south of North Pleasantburg Drive, and east of Worley Road, Rutherford Street, and Rutherford Road.

Schools in this neighborhood include Stone Academy, Summit Drive Elementary School, and League Academy.

References
Developmental history of North Main neighborhood in Greenville, South Carolina. - accessed 27 June 2010.
The North Main neighborhood in Greenville, South Carolina. - accessed 27 June 2010.

Neighborhoods in Greenville, South Carolina